The following lists events that happened in 1947 in Iceland.

Incumbents
President – Sveinn Björnsson
Prime Minister – Ólafur Thors, Stefán Jóhann Stefánsson

Events

Births

20 February – Eggert Magnússon, businessman
4 March – Gunnar Hansen, actor (d. 2015)
29 June – Ágúst Guðmundsson, film director and screenwriter
24 August – Ólafur Haukur Símonarson, novelist and playwright
8 September – Halldór Ásgrímsson, politician (d. 2015)
25 September – Guðmundur Sigurjónsson, chess grandmaster
26 October – Gísli Guðjónsson, professor of forensic psychology
31 October – Gunnsteinn Skúlason, handball player.

Deaths
12 September – Thor Philip Axel Jensen, Danish entrepreneur who settled in Iceland (b. 1863)

References

 
1940s in Iceland
Iceland
Iceland
Years of the 20th century in Iceland